The 2016 APRA Silver Scroll Awards were held on Thursday 29 September 2016 at Vector Arena in Auckland, celebrating excellence in New Zealand songwriting.

Silver Scroll award 

The Silver Scroll award celebrates outstanding achievement in songwriting of original New Zealand pop music. The short list of finalists was announced on 1 September.

The music director for 2016 was musician and  2007 Silver Scroll nominee Sean James Donnelly. As well as overseeing all music performances, he was arranged for the five Silver Scroll finalists to be covered in a unique style by different artists.

Long list 

In July 2016 a top 20 long list was announced. From this list APRA members voted to decide the five songs that will make up the year's short list. Three-time Silver Scroll winner Dave Dobbyn is among the 20 songwriters.

 "10 Years" - Seth Haapu
 "A Lake" - Lawrence Arabia
 "All Eyes In The Room" - Gareth Thomas
 "All Over You" - Leisure
 "August Song" - The Sami Sisters
 "Buried By The Burden" - Pacific Heights featuring Louis Baker
 "Don't Rate That" - David Dallas
 "Dream" - Lydia Cole
 "Give Up Your Dreams" - The Phoenix Foundation
 "Harmony House" - Dave Dobbyn
 "If I Move To Mars" - Thomas Oliver
 "Love Will Be A River" - Holly Arrowsmith with Fly My Pretties
 "March" - Electric Wire Hustle featuring Deva Mahal
 "One Question" - Yoko-Zuna featuring Laughton Kora
 "Pedestrian Support League" - Street Chant
 "Pocket" - Miloux
 "Stuck In Melodies" - Andrew Keoghan
 "The First Man" - Tami Neilson
 "The Hours" - Mice On Stilts
 "We Will Rise Again" - Shayne P Carter

New Zealand Music Hall of Fame 

Singer-songwriter Moana Maniapoto will be inducted into the New Zealand Music Hall of Fame at the Silver Scroll awards ceremony in September.

Other awards 

Six other awards will be presented at the Silver Scroll Awards: APRA Maioha Award (for excellence in contemporary Maori music), SOUNZ Contemporary Award (for creativity and inspiration in composition), and APRA Best Original Music in a Feature Film Award and APRA Best Original Music in a Series Award. The award for the most performed New Zealand song in New Zealand and overseas was dropped in 2016.

APRA song awards 

Outside of the Silver Scroll Awards, APRA presented six genre awards in 2016. The APRA Best Pacific Song was presented at the Pacific Music Awards, the APRA Best Country Music Song was presented at the New Zealand Country Music Awards, the APRA Best Māori Songwriter will be presented at the Waiata Maori Music Awards and the APRA Children’s Song of the Year and What Now Video of the Year will be presented live on What Now.  For the first time in 2016, the award for Best Jazz Composition was awarded, presented at the National Jazz Festival.

References

External links 
 APRA AMCOS Silver Scroll Awards 

New Zealand music awards
2016 in New Zealand music
2016 music awards